Afigya Kwabre South is one of the constituencies represented in the Parliament of Ghana. It elects one Member of Parliament (MP) by the first past the post system of election. Afigya Kwabre South is located in the Afigya-Kwabre District of the Ashanti Region of Ghana.

Boundaries
The Afigya Kwabre South constituency is located entirely within the boundaries of the Afigya-Kwabre South District in the Ashanti Region. The district itself was created on 1 November 2007. It was carved out of Kwabre East and Sekyere South Districts.

Members of Parliament

William Owuraku Aidoo of the New Patriotic Party was the first ever elected MP for this constituency in the 2012 Ghanaian general election.  He retained his seat in the 2016 Ghanaian general election.

Elections

See also
List of Ghana Parliament constituencies

References

External links
Election Passport - American University

Parliamentary constituencies in the Ashanti Region
2012 establishments in Ghana